Francisco Javier Navarro (born 16 April 1967) is a Spanish sprinter. He competed in the men's 200 metres at the 1996 Summer Olympics.

References

1967 births
Living people
Athletes (track and field) at the 1996 Summer Olympics
Spanish male sprinters
Olympic athletes of Spain
Place of birth missing (living people)
World Athletics Championships athletes for Spain
Mediterranean Games silver medalists for Spain
Mediterranean Games medalists in athletics
Athletes (track and field) at the 1997 Mediterranean Games